Club Social y Deportivo Escuintleca, also known as Juventud Escuintleca, is a Guatemalan football club based in Escuintla, Escuintla Department. They play their home games in the Estadio Armando Barillas. The club won its promotion to the top league after winning 2 first division titles in a row. Immediately after the club won the promotion, the owner decided to fire most of the team, including the coach, except the 2 captains Mario Archila and Abner Lara, two young players recently hired by the new management. Bad ownership has led to a last place standing in the current season. The club owner once again fired 5 of its players after a 4–0 defeat to Guatemalan heavyweight  CSD Municipal, which resulted in a 6th player quitting in protesta.

History
Most recently they have again been playing in the Primera División Group "A" or "B". The club was able to gain promotion to the top Guatemalan league after winning the second and first division championships.

Current squad

List of coaches
  Eddy Misael (2011)

References

Football clubs in Guatemala